David Bevan may refer to:
David Bevan (footballer) (born 1989), Irish footballer
David Bevan (judge) (1873–1954), judge of the Supreme Court of the Northern Territory
Dai Bevan, Welsh rugby league footballer who played in the 1900s
Dai Royston Bevan (1928–2008), Welsh rugby union and rugby league footballer who played in the 1950s
David Gilroy Bevan (1928–1996), British Conservative politician
Llewelyn David Bevan (1842–1918), Congregational minister and academic active in Australia
David Evans-Bevan (1902–1973), industrialist from south Wales
David Bevan (cricketer) (born 1943), British cricket player
David Bevan (banker) (1774–1846), British banker
David Bevan (mathematician) (born 1961) English mathematician

See also
Bevan (surname)